Satish Subhashchandra Poonia is an Indian politician. Currently, he is the president of Bharatiya Janata Party in Rajasthan and member of the Rajasthan Legislative Assembly representing Amber Vidhan Sabha since 2018. He is the first Jat politician to lead the BJP in state. A party worker at the core he has a Rashtriya Swayamsevak Sangh (RSS) background and is close to the rank of the Sangh Parivar.

Early life and education 

Dr. Satish Poonia was born on 24 October 1964. He hails from a farmer family in Rajgarh, a small village in Churu district of Rajasthan. His father, Late. Shri Subhash Chandra Poonia was the former head of Rajgarh Panchayat Samiti. His mother is Smt. Parmeshwari Devi.  Poonia's uncle Late Shri Ramswaroop Poonia was a freedom fighter and an associate of Chaudhary Kumbharam Arya, a freedom fighter of the Bikaner division and the then leader of the Praja Parishad movement. He is married to Mrs. Mohini Poonia, a teacher by profession and they have two children; son, Maheep Poonia and daughter, Anushka Poonia.

Dr. Poonia's early education was completed in Rajgarh, after which he completed his further studies from Churu. He graduated from Maharaja College in the year 1989. After this he did L.L.B from Rajasthan University. He holds a Diploma in Labor Law, Criminology and Indian History and Culture from Law College. In 1994, he finished M.Sc. in Geography and after that did PhD in geography from Rajasthan University.

Entry into Politics

Student Politics

Dr. Satish Poonia, influenced by the nationalist ideology of the RSS, he joined Akhil Bharatiya Vidyarthi Parishad (ABVP) in 1982. Over the next decade he worked in ABVP as Metropolitan Co-Secretary, State Co-Secretary, Metropolitan Secretary, and Pradesh Mantri in the Unit President at Maharaja College in Jaipur.

From 1988 to 1989, he played a very important role in the student union election movement at Rajasthan University and in the educational reform movement of ABVP. In 1989, he became the General Secretary of the Student Union at Rajasthan University and led agitation against Bofors scandal, and was also jailed during this period.

In 1992, he became the state general secretary of the Bharatiya Janata Yuva Morcha and successfully organised the historic youth conference in Kota. He was made the State President of Bharatiya Janata Yuva Morcha, Rajasthan in 1998.  After the Bharatiya Janata Party's defeat in Rajasthan in 1998, he undertook a 550 km padyatra from 14 March to 7 April. This was the first such journey in Rajasthan's political history and still holds the record of being the only such yatra by any politician. He took this padayatra to boost the morale of workers covering 34 assembly constituencies, 9 Lok Sabha constituencies, 225 villages.

State politics

Dr. Poonia worked as State General Secretary in Bharatiya Janata Party, Rajasthan from 2004 to 2006 and as State Morcha in charge from 2006 to 2007. He has been the State General Secretary of the Bharatiya Janata Party four times from 2004 to 2014 with various organisational responsibilities, from intensive migration from remote tribal areas to marginal desert areas, strengthening the party from village to village, and successfully led various political movements.

In the year 2011, he was the convener of senior BJP leader L.K. Advani’s Jan Chetna Yatra. In 2013, contributed to the successful running of “Suraj Sankalp Yatra 2013” by then BJP State President Smt. Vasundhara Raje. He played a very important role in the Haryana Vidhan Sabha elections of 2010 and 2015.

Development of Amber Vidhan Sabha 

In his Amber Assembly constituency his focus is on education, healthcare, roads and transportation, and clean drinking water. In his tenure through the Sarva Shiksha Abhiyan, an amount of Rs 1.75 crore has been utilised for the development of various schools' infrastructure in the region. His focus is mainly on reviving girls' education in his constituency and the state. In his constituency, he has constructed toilets for girls. To strengthen the medical facilities in the Amber constituency, more than Rs. 150 lakh have been spent from MLA-LAD. He has constructed a community healthcare centre worth Rs 5.25 crore in his constituency. Under his visionary leadership, he has sanctioned works related to clean drinking water amounting to Rs. 250 lakh.

Work during Covid-19 

Dr. Satish Poonia launched a campaign named ‘Public Service’ to help the people fight the pandemic. Through this campaign, more than 2.5 lakhs of his party workers helped in collecting 40,000 units of blood voluntarily and the party workers prepared nearly 10 lakh food packets along with 3.25 lakh ration kits distributed to Covid-19 affected people. Through his efforts he connected with over 75,000 people and helped them in whatever way he could.

External links 

Twitter- @DrSatishPoonia, @OfficeOfDrSP

Facebook- 

YouTube-  

Telegram- 

Website-

References 

Living people
People from Jaipur
Bharatiya Janata Party politicians from Rajasthan
State Presidents of Bharatiya Janata Party
Rajasthan MLAs 2018–2023
1964 births